This article lists the commanders-in-chief of the Chilean Army. The Chilean Army is the land force of Chile. The Chilean Army dates back to 1810.

The current Commander-in-Chief is Army General Javier Iturriaga del Campo. He was appointed by former President Sebastián Piñera on 9 March 2022.

Independence and national organization (1810–1830)

|-
! Colspan=6|Army Commander-in-chief

Conservative and liberal republics (1830–1891)

|-
! Colspan=6|Army Commander-in-chief

|-
! Colspan=6|Senior General Officer

|-
! Colspan=6|Field Commander-in-chief

|-
! Colspan=6|Inspector General

|-
! Colspan=6|Field Commander-in-chief

Parliamentary republic (1891–1925)

Presidential republic (1925–1973)

|-
! Colspan=6|Inspector General

|-
! Colspan=6|Army Commander-in-chief

Military regime and the present (1973–present)

See also
Chilean Army
List of commanders-in-chief of the Chilean Navy
List of commanders-in-chief of the Chilean Air Force

References

Chilean Army officers
Chilean generals
Chile
Chilean military-related lists